The Little Ōnahau River is a river of the northwest of New Zealand's South Island. It has its sources close to the track in Kahurangi National Park that follows a ridgeline to Parapara Peak, near the source of the Ōnahau River. From here, it flows initially southwest and then northwest, passing underneath State Highway 60 just west of the Tākaka Aerodrome. Shortly before reaching the sea, it flows into the Ōnahau River, reaching Golden Bay via a small estuary to the west of Rangihaeata.

See also
List of rivers of New Zealand

References

Rivers of the Tasman District
Rivers of New Zealand